Brendon Todd (born July 22, 1985) is an American professional golfer who plays on the PGA Tour.

Early career
Todd played his junior golf at Prestonwood Country Club in Cary, North Carolina and Green Hope High School. He won the North Carolina High School Athletic Association (NCHSAA) 4A classification individual championship three times at Green Hope High, winning his freshman, junior, and senior seasons.

Todd attended the University of Georgia, where he was part of the 2005 team that won the National Championship. He was a four-time All-American as a collegiate golfer.

Professional career
Todd joined the Nationwide Tour in 2008. That year he won the Utah Championship, and finished 19th on the money list, earning him a spot on the PGA Tour in 2009.

At the 2009 Athens Regional Foundation Classic on the Nationwide Tour, Todd became the first player on the Tour to ace the same hole twice in the same tournament. On April 16, during the first round, his ace on the 157 yard, par-3, 17th hole, came with a 7-iron. The next day, the ace came with an 8-iron from 147 yards. In his rookie season on the PGA Tour in 2009, he made only 5 of 21 cuts, and did not earn a tour card for 2010.

Todd rejoined the Nationwide Tour in 2010. In 2011, he had a steady season on that tour, and was medalist at the season-ending qualifying school to return to the PGA Tour. In 2012, he was the final person to retain any status on the PGA Tour. His finish of 150th on the PGA Tour's money list meant that he retained conditional status and avoided the second round of Q School. As a member of the 126-150 category on the PGA Tour, Todd also had full Web.com Tour status.

In 2013, Todd won his second Web.com Tour event, the 2013 Stadion Classic at UGA. He finished 20th on the 2013 Web.com Tour regular season money list, earning him a 2014 PGA Tour card.

On May 18, 2014, Todd won his first PGA Tour event, in his 77th start at the HP Byron Nelson Championship. Todd shot a bogey free round of 66 on the final day to finish two strokes ahead of Mike Weir. The victory earned Todd a two-year tour exemption and ensured a first visit to The Masters in 2015. He followed up his win with a T5 at the Crowne Plaza Invitational at Colonial to move inside the Top 60 in the Official World Golf Ranking. Therefore, he earned entry into his first major, the U.S. Open, where he ended 17th.

Todd placed as high as 40th in the world rankings in 2014, but a string of bad finishes and missed cuts cost him his PGA Tour card after the 2015–16 season. 

On November 3, 2019, Todd shot a nine-under 62, including seven straight front-nine birdies, to win the Bermuda Championship on the PGA Tour by four shots over 54-hole leader Harry Higgs. "A year ago, I wasn't sure if I was going to keep playing," Todd said after the round. "So it's really special to get this win this soon." In September 2018, Todd had missed the cut in 37 of his last 40 starts. At that point, Todd had dropped outside the top 2000 golfers in the world and failed to get through the second stage of Q School. He was planning on retiring after the season and going into restaurant franchise ownership. "It was basically the ball-striking yips," Todd told Golf Channel in June 2019. "Every time I played, I would hit a 4-iron or a 3-wood 50 yards right, and I knew why but I couldn't really fix it. When the misses get so big that it's an automatic double bogey, narrowing that miss up is hard." On November 18, Todd won the Mayakoba Golf Classic for his second straight win.

On June 27, 2020, Todd fired his career lowest round of 61 during the third round of the Travelers Championship. This allowed Todd to hold the 54-hole lead by two strokes over Dustin Johnson. He shot a 75 in the final round to drop back to a T11 finish.

Todd held the 54-hole lead at the WGC-FedEx St. Jude Invitational by a single stroke after an opening three rounds of 64-64-69. He shot a final round of 75 to finish six shots behind the winner and a T15 finish. This was Todd's best finish in a WGC event.

Professional wins (7)

PGA Tour wins (3)

Web.com Tour wins (2)

*Note: The 2013 Stadion Classic at UGA was shortened to 54 holes due to weather.

NGA Hooters Tour wins (1)
2007 Dothan Classic

eGolf Professional Tour wins (1)
2007 Musgrove Mill Classic

Results in major championships
Results not in chronological order in 2020.

CUT = missed the half-way cut
"T" = tied
NT = No tournament due to COVID-19 pandemic

Summary

Most consecutive cuts made – 3 (2014 U.S. Open – 2014 PGA)

Results in The Players Championship

CUT = missed the halfway cut
"T" indicates a tie for a place
C = Canceled after the first round due to the COVID-19 pandemic

Results in World Golf Championships
Results not in chronological order before 2015.

1Cancelled due to COVID-19 pandemic

NT = No tournament
"T" = Tied

See also
2008 Nationwide Tour graduates
2011 PGA Tour Qualifying School graduates
2013 Web.com Tour Finals graduates
2019 Korn Ferry Tour Finals graduates

References

External links

American male golfers
Georgia Bulldogs men's golfers
PGA Tour golfers
Korn Ferry Tour graduates
Golfers from Atlanta
Golfers from Pittsburgh
1985 births
Living people